GPI transamidase component PIG-T is an enzyme that in humans is encoded by the PIGT gene.

This gene encodes a protein that is involved in glycosylphosphatidylinositol (GPI)-anchor biosynthesis. The GPI-anchor is a glycolipid found on many blood cells and serves to anchor proteins to the cell surface. This protein is an essential component of the multisubunit enzyme, GPI transamidase. GPI transamidase mediates GPI anchoring in the endoplasmic reticulum, by catalyzing the transfer of fully assembled GPI units to proteins.

Interactions
PIGT has been shown to interact with PIGK and GPAA1.

References

Further reading